Lévy Koffi Djidji (born 30 November 1992) is a professional footballer who plays as a defender for Italian Serie A club Torino. Born in France, Djidji represents the Ivory Coast national team.

Club career
Born in Bagnolet, Djidji started his career in the youth team of his hometown club AJN Bagnolet. In the spring of 2006, he left his hometown and signed with Saint-Herblain Olympique Club.

In summer 2007, at the age of fifteen, he moved to the under-18 team of Ligue 1 side FC Nantes, being promoted to the reserve team one year later for the 2008–09 season. He played in his first three years for the reserve team in ten games in the CFA 2 Groupe G.

On 4 August 2012, he played his senior debut in the Ligue 2 for Nantes against Nimes Olympique. He scored his first goal in Ligue 1 against Montpellier on 22 March 2014, in a 2–1 win for Nantes over Montpellier.

On 17 August 2018, Djidji joined the Italian Serie A club Torino on loan with an option to buy.

On 5 October 2020, Djidji joined Crotone on loan.

International career
Djidji was born and raised in France to an Ivorian father and a French mother. He received a call-up to the Ivory national team for their friendly 0–0 tie against Hungary.

References

External links
 

1992 births
Living people
Citizens of Ivory Coast through descent
Ivorian footballers
Association football defenders
Ivory Coast international footballers
French footballers
Ivorian people of French descent
French sportspeople of Ivorian descent
Ligue 1 players
Ligue 2 players
Serie A players
FC Nantes players
Torino F.C. players
F.C. Crotone players
French expatriate footballers
Ivorian expatriate footballers
French expatriate sportspeople in Italy
Ivorian expatriate sportspeople in Italy
Expatriate footballers in Italy